The blue-leaved mistletoe (Agelanthus pungu) is a species of perennial, parasitic plant in the family Loranthaceae, which is native to the southeastern Afrotropics.

Description
Its size is variable, as is the shape of its leaves. The glabrous and opposite leaves are grey-green to blue-green in colour. A fuller description is given at Govaerts et al. (2018)

Range
A. pungu has been recorded in Tanzania, Zambia, Malawi, Zimbabwe, Mozambique, northeastern Namibia and northern South Africa. It is found from 150 to 2,100 meters in altitude.

Habitat
It grows on a range of host plants in miombo woodland, Acacia-Commiphora bushland, wooded grassland, forest edges and in riparian growth.

References

External links

pungu
Taxa named by Émile Auguste Joseph De Wildeman